The South African cricket team toured Pakistan for the first time in October 2003. They played against the Pakistan national team in a five-match One Day International (ODI) series and a two-match Test series. Pakistan won the first two ODI matches, before South Africa came back to win the series 3–2. Pakistan then won the first Test, before the second finished as a draw, giving Pakistan victory in the series.

ODI series

1st ODI

2nd ODI

3rd ODI

4th ODI

5th ODI

Test series

1st Test

2nd Test

External links
Series page at ESPNcricinfo

2003 in Pakistani cricket
2003 in South African cricket
International cricket competitions in 2003–04
Pakistani cricket seasons from 2000–01
2003-04